Srećko Lisinac (born 17 May 1992) is a Serbian volleyball player, member of the Serbia men's national volleyball team and Italian club Itas Trentino, German Champion (2013), Polish Champion (2018).

Career

Clubs
In the 2013/2014 season, Lisinac won the title of German Champion with Berlin Recycling Volleys. In 2014, he moved to PGE Skra Bełchatów. He won a title of Polish Champion 2014 with PGE Skra Bełchatów. On October 8, 2014, his team won Polish SuperCup. On February 7, 2016, he played with PGE Skra and won the 2016 Polish Cup after beating ZAKSA in the final. In April 2016 he was a member of the same team which won a bronze medal in the 2015–16 PlusLiga championship. At the end of 2017–2018 season he signed a contract with Italian club Trentino Volley.

National team
He is a bronze medallist of the European Championship 2013. On July 19, 2015 Serbian national team with him in squad went to the final of World League, but they lost with United States 0–3 and achieved silver medal. Lisinac received individual award for the Best Middle Blocker (ex–aequo with Maxwell Holt).

Sporting achievements

Clubs
 CEV Champions League
  2020/2021 – with Itas Trentino

 FIVB Club World Championship
  Poland 2018 – with Trentino Volley
  Brasil 2021 – with Itas Trentino
  Brazil 2022 – with Trentino Itas

 CEV Cup
  2018/2019 – with Itas Trentino

 National championships
 2013/2014  German Championship, with Berlin Recycling Volleys
 2014/2015  Polish SuperCup, with PGE Skra Bełchatów
 2015/2016  Polish Cup, with PGE Skra Bełchatów
 2016/2017  Polish Championship, with PGE Skra Bełchatów
 2017/2018  Polish SuperCup, with PGE Skra Bełchatów
 2017/2018  Polish Championship, with PGE Skra Bełchatów
 2018/2019  Italian SuperCup, with Itas Trentino
 2021/2022  Italian SuperCup, with Itas Trentino
 2022/2023  Italian Cup, with Itas Trentino

Youth national team
 2010  CEV U20 European Championship
 2011  FIVB U21 World Championship
 2013  FIVB U23 World Championship

Individual awards
 2013: CEV European Championship – Best Blocker
 2015: FIVB World League – Best Middle Blocker
 2016: Polish Cup – Best Blocker
 2016: Memorial of Hubert Jerzy Wagner – Best Middle Blocker
 2016: FIVB World League – Best Middle Blocker
 2017: CEV European Championship – Best Middle Blocker
 2018: Polish Cup – Best Blocker
 2019: CEV European Championship – Best Middle Blocker

References

External links
 Player profile at CEV.eu
 Player profile at LegaVolley.it
 Player profile at PlusLiga.pl
 Player profile at WorldofVolley.com
 Player profile at Volleybox.net

1992 births
Living people
Sportspeople from Kraljevo
Serbian men's volleyball players
German Champions of men's volleyball
Polish Champions of men's volleyball
Serbian expatriate sportspeople in Germany
Expatriate volleyball players in Germany
Serbian expatriate sportspeople in Poland
Expatriate volleyball players in Poland
Serbian expatriate sportspeople in Italy
Expatriate volleyball players in Italy
AZS Częstochowa players
Skra Bełchatów players
Trentino Volley players
European champions for Serbia